Corycium Antrum was an inland town of ancient Cilicia, above Arima, inhabited during the Byzantine era.

Its site is tentatively located near Cennet Obruğu in Asiatic Turkey.

References

Populated places in ancient Cilicia
Former populated places in Turkey
Populated places of the Byzantine Empire
History of Mersin Province